Windermere Lake Cruises is a boat company which provides leisure trips on Windermere in the central part of the English Lake District. It is based in Bowness-on-Windermere, Cumbria.

History
Windermere is the largest natural lake in England, and has supported commercial traffic for many years. In the early 19th century sailing packets operated the length of the lake carrying both passengers and goods. The first steamship on the lake, and indeed on any lake in England, was the paddle steamer Lady of the Lake, launched in 1845 for the Windermere Steam Yacht Company. In 1847 a second company, the Windermere Iron Steamboat Company, put into service the Firefly, following that by the Dragonfly in 1850. After some years of competition, the two companies merged as the Windermere United Yacht Company in 1858. This company introduced the steamers Rothay (1867) and the Swan (1869). The Rothay was the last paddle steamer built for use on the lake, with all subsequent vessels being propeller driven.

In 1869 the Furness Railway opened its branch from Ulverston to Lakeside station, intended as an interchange between train and steamer at the southern end of the lake. The railway company had already purchased shares in the Windermere United Yacht Company, and in 1872 it took full control. In 1871 the Furness Railway had purchased the steam barge Raven, which in addition to carrying cargo to houses, hotels and businesses around the lake, also served as an ice-breaker for the passenger steamers. Other vessels introduced after the Furness Railway took over the yacht company include the Cygnet (1879), Teal (1879), Tern (1891), Swift (1900) and Britannia (built in 1879 and acquired second-hand in 1909). The Rothay was scrapped in 1891 and the Britannia in 1919.

In 1923, with the grouping of the railways, the lake steamers came under the control of the London, Midland and Scottish Railway (LMS). The LMS built two motor vessels for use on Windermere, the Teal (1936) and the Swan (1938). The Raven was sold out of service in 1927, and is now an exhibit at the Windermere Steamboat Museum, whilst the earlier Teal was scrapped in 1929 and the earlier Swan in 1938.

In 1948, the Windermere steamers came under the control of the British Transport Commission as part of the nationalisation of the British railways, passing to the British Railways Board or British Rail in 1963, along with all other railway related shipping services. In 1970 the British Rail shipping services were rebranded as Sealink, with the Windermere operation being known as Sealink Windermere. The Cygnet was scrapped in 1955.

In 1984, as part of the privatisation of the British railways, Sealink was sold to Sea Containers who resurrected the Windermere Iron Steamboat Company name for its Windermere operations. In 1993 the Windermere Iron Steamboat Company was bought by the local Bowness Bay Boating Company, who already operated a fleet of launches on the lake, and the merged operation renamed Windermere Lake Cruises. The Swift was scrapped in 1999, having been laid up since 1981, but a new Swift joined the fleet in 2020.

Operation

The headquarters of Windermere Lake Cruises is near the ferry pier at Bowness-on-Windermere, whilst the boats are maintained on a slipway at Lakeside and a dry dock at Waterhead. The fleet of 17 passenger carrying vessels comprises four larger ships, usually referred to as steamers although all are now diesel/ diesel electric powered, and a number of smaller launches. There is also a large number of self drive hire boats. They operate a number of services, including:

Fleet

Steamers

Launches

References

External links

Ferry companies of England
Ferry transport in England
Transport in Cumbria
Tourist attractions in Cumbria